Sebastiaan, in the past also Sebastiaen,  is the Dutch form of the masculine given name Sebastian. People with the name include:

Sebastiaen van Aken (1648–1722), Flemish historical painter
Sebastiaan van Bemmelen (born 1989), Dutch volleyball player
Sebastiaan Bleekemolen (born 1978), Dutch racing driver
Sebastiaan Bökkerink (born 1994), Dutch footballer
Sebastiaan Bornauw (born 1999), Belgian footballer
Sebastiaan Bowier (born 1987), Dutch cyclist
Sebastiaan Braat (born 1992), Dutch cricketer
Sebastiaan Brebels (born 1995), Belgian footballer
Sebastiaan Bremer (born 1970), Dutch painter and photographer
 Sebastiaan van den Brink (born 1982), Dutch footballer
Sebastiaan De Wilde (born 1993), Belgian footballer
Sebastiaan Gokke (born 1978), Dutch cricketer
 Sebastiaan van de Goor (born 1971), Dutch volleyball player
Sebastiaan Haring (born 1968), Dutch philosopher, writer, and television presenter
Sebastiaan van Houten (born 1975), American fangsmith and vampire book author
Sebastiaen Jansen Krol (1595–1674), Dutch Director of New Netherland from 1632 to 1633
Sebastiaan Nooij (born 1987), Dutch baseball player
Sebastiaan Rutten (born 1965), Dutch martial artist
Sebastiaan Steur (born 1984), Dutch footballer
Sebastiaan Tromp (1889–1975), Dutch Jesuit priest, theologian, and Latinist
Sebastiaan Verschuren (born 1988), Dutch freestyle swimmer
Sebastiaen Vrancx (1573–1647), Flemish painter and draughtsman
Sebastiaan Weenink (born 1986), Dutch squash player

See also
Bastiaan

Dutch masculine given names